The Franpipe is a  long natural gas pipeline from the Draupner E riser in the North Sea to the receiving terminal at Port Ouest in Dunkirk, France.  The gas transported to France originates mainly from Sleipner East and Troll Vest gas fields.  The pipeline was officially inaugurated on 9 October 1998.

It cost 10.6 billion NOK. The pipeline is owned by Gassled partners and operated by Gassco. The technical service provider is Statoil.

The Dunkirk receiving terminal is owned by the Gassled partners (65%) and GDF Suez (35%).  The Dunkirk terminal is operated by Gassco from Gassco's Zeebrugge control center.

References

External links

 Franpipe (Gassco website)

Energy infrastructure completed in 1998
North Sea energy
Natural gas pipelines in Norway
Natural gas pipelines in France
France–Norway relations
Pipelines under the North Sea
1998 establishments in Norway
1998 establishments in France